The 29th government of Turkey (20 February 1965 – 27 October 1965) was a caretaker government in Turkey. The prime minister was Suat Hayri Ürgüplü, an independent. Four parties supported him: Justice Party (AP), New Turkey Party (YTP), Republican Villagers Nation Party (CKMP), and Nation Party (MP). (This was the only time Nation Party ever participated in a government).

The government
Some of the cabinet members were changed during the lifespan of the cabinet. In the list below, the serving period of cabinet members who served only a part of the cabinet's lifespan are shown in the column "Notes".

Aftermath
The government resigned after the elections held on 10 October 1965, which the Justice Party won by a landslide. The 29th government was succeeded by the government of Süleyman Demirel.

References

Cabinets of Turkey
Cabinets established in 1965
Cabinets disestablished in 1965
Coalition governments of Turkey
Members of the 29th government of Turkey
12th parliament of Turkey
1965 disestablishments in Turkey
1965 establishments in Turkey